The SIG Sauer P938 is a subcompact single-action pistol chambered for the 9×19mm Parabellum cartridge, manufactured by SIG Sauer and introduced at the 2011 SHOT Show. A variant chambered for .22 Long Rifle was introduced in 2014.

Design
The P938, chambered for 9×19mm Parabellum, is a slightly larger version of the SIG Sauer P238 pistol, which is chambered for .380 ACP. A finger relief exists under the trigger guard. Grip panels are one of three kinds of wood, Hogue G-10 Extreme composite, or rubber wrap-around in the "Sport" model. The frame is metal, unlike many other subcompact 9 mm handguns. The frame for all P938 models is anodized aluminum alloy, and the slide is stainless steel either bare or with SIG's Nitron coating.

Flush-fit magazines hold 6 rounds, while 7-round magazines with an extension are available. The safety is ambidextrous, while the magazine release is only on the left side.

Specialty versions have been made such as the Scorpion, Nightmare, Extreme, Equinox, AG (aluminum grip), and SAS (SIG Anti-Snag) as well as for the Legion series.

P938-22
The P938-22 variant is chambered for .22 Long Rifle and features a 10-round magazine, alloy slide, and black hard coat finish. The P938-22 is offered in Standard and Target packages. Barrels on the P938-22 are longer than on the P938.

References

Further reading

External links
 P938 Nitron and P938 Nightmare video by Sig Sauer
 P938 Legion video by Sig Sauer

9mm Parabellum semi-automatic pistols
.22 LR pistols
SIG Sauer semi-automatic pistols
Semi-automatic pistols of the United States
Weapons and ammunition introduced in 2011